The Short Empire was a medium-range four-engined monoplane flying boat, designed and developed by Short Brothers during the 1930s to meet the requirements of the growing commercial airline sector, with a particular emphasis upon its usefulness upon the core routes that served the United Kingdom. It was developed and manufactured in parallel with the Short Sunderland maritime patrol bomber, which went on to serve in the Second World War; a further derivative that was later developed was the piggy-back Short Mayo Composite.

The development of the Short Empire had been heavily influenced by its primary customer, Imperial Airways, who had originally developed the requirements to which it was initially ordered and designed from. Imperial Airways, and its successor, the British Overseas Airways Corporation (BOAC), along with Qantas and TEAL, operated the type in commercial service. Upon entering service, the Empire routinely flew between the British mainland and Australia and the various British colonies in Africa and Asia, typically carrying a combination of passenger and mail cargoes; the Empires were also used on various other routes, such as on the service between Bermuda and New York City.

The Empire also saw military service during the Second World War. The Royal Air Force (RAF), Royal Australian Air Force (RAAF), Royal New Zealand Air Force (RNZAF), and briefly the Royal Canadian Air Force (RCAF) used the type to conduct various military operations, particularly as an airborne platform for anti-submarine patrols and for general transport duties.

Development

Origins
During the 1930s, global demand for air travel was consistently and rapidly growing. Thus, keen to grow their share of this emerging market, British airline Imperial Airways was keen to expand and sought the latest technology to do so. In particular, Imperial Airways' technical advisor, Major Robert Hobart Mayo developed a specification for a new type of aircraft to serve both passenger and freight requirements throughout the world. According to aviation author Geoffrey Norris, at the time, it was considered to be impossible to construct a land-based aeroplane of such size and weight that still possessed acceptable landing/take-off performance, thus it was determined that a flying boat would be required.

Early on, it was apparent that Short Brothers, who had previously developed and produced several large flying boats for Imperial Airways and the Royal Air Force (RAF) which had proven to be sound designs in terms of performance and safety, would be a frontrunner to fulfil the requirement. However, Shorts was hesitant to build such an aircraft, due to the necessary advances involved, straight from the drawing board without the production of a preceding prototype, and thus requested to be allowed the time to build such an aircraft; this was rejected by Imperial Airways, stating that such a delay was not permissible. In 1935, Imperial Airways announced the placement of an order for 28 flying boats of an as-of-yet undesigned type, weighing 18 tonnes each; the order was reportedly hailed as being "one of the world's boldest experiments in aviation", while sceptics referred to the decision less favourably as being a 'gamble'.

A design team led by Arthur Gouge set about designing what would become the Empire. It was quickly determined that, in order to possess the sufficient clearance between the tips of the propellers and the water, the wing would need to be in a high mounted position; initially to be housed in a hump above the fuselage for sufficient height, the fuselage depth was instead increased, providing more internal volume than required but enabling a lighter and stronger integration of the cantilever wing with the fuselage. Shorts' own convention for wide planing bottomed hulls for their flying boats was overturned as the 18-tonne weight would generate excessive drag with such a configuration; following a series of water tank experiments, a new type of planing bottom with a reduced beam deemed suitable. The basic aerodynamic design was derived from the smaller Short Scion Senior floatplane, which served in all but name as a half-scale prototype for the Empire and for its sibling, the military-orientated Short Sunderland.

At the time of development, the British aircraft industry had never attempted to construct an aeroplane of this size and complexity before; accordingly, many new techniques were devised to overcome problems encountered, particularly during its construction process. Shorts had to develop its own machinery to produce the necessary 'T'-shaped Hiduminium alloy lengths that comprised the main spar. A specialised and patented flap arrangement, known as Gouge flaps after their creator, was employed on the Empire to increase wing area with only a small increase in drag and without heavy disrupting airflow over the top of the aerofoil; in operation, the lift coefficient of the wing could be increased by 30 percent, reducing the landing speed by 12 per cent, without employing any trimming to adjust.

Initial production

On 4 July 1936, the first of the Empire flying boats to be built, G-ADHL, named 'Canopus', conducted its maiden flight, flown by Shorts' chief test pilot, John Lankester Parker. Early flights of the type were relatively trouble-free, Parker declaring his satisfaction with the aircraft's performance; the new styling of the planing bottom used also quickly proved its value. On 17 September 1936, the first flight of G-ADHL on behalf of Imperial Airways occurred, flown by Major H G Brackley, Imperial Airways' Air Superintendent; the final delivery and proving flight of the aircraft to Marseilles, France took place on 22 October 1936. The first series of the Short Empires, the S.23, could carry 5 crew, 17 passengers, and 4,480 lb (2,035 kg) of cargo at a maximum speed of 174 knots (320 km/h) and was powered by four  Bristol Pegasus Xc radial engines.

The second Empire and the first of the long-range models to be produced, G-ADHM, named 'Caledonia', performed her first flight on 15 September 1936 and was delivered to Imperial Airways on 4 December 1936. From September 1936 onwards, the Empire was produced at a rate of one aircraft per month; typically, each aircraft's delivery date occurred only a few days after having performed its maiden flight, the hand-over sometimes happened immediately following the first flight. The Empire was officially known as the C-class by Imperial Airways and each aircraft operated by them was given a name beginning with a 'C'.

On 26 February 1938, the final three Empires of the initial order placed by Imperial Airways – 'Coorong', 'Coogee', and 'Corio' – were diverted from the Imperial Airways order and were delivered instead to the Anglo-Australian Qantas Empire Airways. In late 1937, due to Imperial Airways satisfaction with its operational experience with the aircraft of the initial batch, the company placed a follow-on order for another 11 Empire flying boats; combined with the original 28 order, this had the distinction of being the largest single order to have ever been placed for a British civil aircraft at that time. While the first three aircraft of the additional order were of the typical S.23 class, intended for Qantas Empire Airways, the rest were manufactured to a differing design, designated as the S.30. A total of 42 Empires were built, all at Short's Rochester factory.

Further development

The first of the S.30 flying boats to be laid out and completed was G-AFCT, named 'Champion'. In December 1938, the second S.30 aircraft G-AFCU, named 'Cabot' became the first aircraft of the series to conduct the first successful takeoff. The last three aircraft of this order – 'Captain Cook', 'Clare' and 'Aotearoa' – were renamed and re-registered for use by TEAL. In 1939, a final S.30 flying boat, G-AFKZ, was ordered and delivered to Imperial Airways in late March 1940.

A total of four flying S.30 series flying boats – Cabot, Caribou, Clyde and Connemara – were equipped with in-flight refuelling equipment and extra fuel tanks in order that they could be used to provide a regular trans-atlantic airmail service. The refuelling was performed by three converted Handley Page Harrow bombers, one operating out of Ireland and two out of Newfoundland.

In 1939, Imperial Airways placed a further follow-on order for a modified model of the S.30, designated as the S.33. This series had the same basic construction as its immediate predecessors, the new Pegasus XI engine, a development of the powerplant used by the original S.23 series, was adopted instead. Out of these three final aircraft, only two – 'Clifton' and 'Cleopatra' – would be completed and delivered to the newly formed British Overseas Airways Corporation (BOAC).

A substantial larger development of the Empire flying boat, effectively a new aircraft, was the S.26, designated as the "G class". It was intended to be used for year-round services on the North Atlantic route. Only a small number were built, and these were quickly impressed into military service during the Second World War.

Design

The Short Empire flying boat is a relatively clean-looking high-wing monoplane, initially powered by an arrangement of four wing-mounted Bristol Pegasus Xc radial engines which drove de Havilland-built variable-pitch propellers. The engines were each enclosed within NACA cowls and mounted ahead of the leading edge of the wings. This allowed portions of the leading edge adjacent to the engines to be hinged forwards and used as platforms from which to maintain the engines.

Alternative engines were installed upon various models of the aircraft, of both greater and lower power outputs depending upon the model's role and purpose. Overall, its useful load included  of fuel (weighing ),  of oil, assorted onboard equipment (weighing ), along with the payload itself and a crew complement of five (weighing ).

The wings had a flush-riveted Alclad covering and featured both Frise-type ailerons and the internally-developed Gouge flaps, the latter of which were actuated by an electric motor connected via a gearing system and screw jacks, allowing the flaps to be lowered in 60 seconds and raised within 90 seconds. Large cylindrical 325-gallon fuel tanks were accommodated within the wings, set in between the inner and outer engines, and were fitted as standard; on long-range variants of the aircraft, additional fuel tanks were present in the wings, up to a total of three containing 280 gallons, 325 gallons, and 175 gallons in each wing. Elements of the leading edge of the wing, set upon either side of the engine nacelles, could be folded down to act as servicing platforms for both the engines and the floats, the latter of which were carried upon tandem struts fixed onto the main spar and featured shock absorbers in order to eliminate undue torsional loads being transmitted to the wings by the sudden impact of waves while travelling at speed.

The hull, which had adopted a radically new shape, employed mainly traditional construction methods at Shorts. The structure used a combination of 'Z'-shaped stringers and 'I'-shaped girders to form triangular sections that ran along the chines located at the point where the fuselage sides met with the planing underside. As a measure to simplify manufacturing and to increase the available internal volume, only a simple curvature sweeping the sides of the hull into the chines was employed; on previous Shorts-built flying boats, a more complex 'S'-shaped curvature and a sudden reduction in beam just above the chines had been employed instead.

This office contained controls such as electrical fuseboxes and circuit switches, ventilation controls, and fuelcocks. The lower deck contained a large marine compartment containing an anchor, a pair of drogues, a mooring bollard, and a boat hook, along with a step ladder to the cockpit; aft of the mooring compartment was the forward passenger saloon, followed by a central corridor flanked by the toilets and galley, a mid-ship cabin, a spacious promenade cabin, and finally an aft-cabin. The cabins could be alternatively outfitted with comfortable seating or bunks for sleeper services. Near the rear of the aircraft, a further compartment for the purpose of containing freight and mail was present which extended into the after fuselage.

The flying crew was seated in a spacious cockpit, also referred to as the bridge; the captain and co-pilot were seated side-by-side while the radio operator sat behind the captain, facing rearwards. The flight deck was relatively well equipped for the era, including features such as an autopilot; the flying instrumentation included a Hughes-built turn indicator, compass, and variometer, a Sperry Corporation-built artificial horizon and heading indicator, a Kollsman-built sensitive altimeter, a Marconi-built radio direction finder, a Smiths-built chronometer, and an attitude indicator. The radio operator was furnished with Marconi-built shock-proof radio sets for receiving and transmitting across the radio spectrum; the retractable loop antenna could be repositioned for visual or aural homing.

While designed as civil aircraft, examples of the type would not only see military service but be specifically refitted for this purpose. In 1941, two Empire flying boats – 'Clio' and 'Cordelia' returned to Shorts' Belfast facility, where they were modified with the addition of gun turrets in dorsal and rear positions and Air to Surface Vessel (ASV) radar equipment installed on the top and sides of the fuselage. They were used by Coastal Command. More extensive military use was made of the Empire's sibling design, the Short Sunderland.

Operational history

On 8 February 1937, one of the Empire flying boats, Castor, conducted the first regular flight, flying from Calshot, Hampshire, England to Alexandria, Egypt. This flight, which covered a distance of roughly  non-stop, showed that Britain could move military materiel to its overseas bases by air. On 18 February 1937, Caledonia, the first of the Empires built, flew the same Calshot-Alexandria route; it was able to traverse the route non-stop at an average speed of 170 mph.

On 5 July 1937, the first crossing of the Atlantic by an Empire flying boat was conducted. On an experimental basis, Caledonia, piloted by Captain W N Cummings, flew a  route from Foynes on the River Shannon west to Botwood, Newfoundland. On the same day, an American Sikorsky S-42 flying boat flew the opposite direction. On its return flight, conducted on 22 July 1937, Caledonia flew the same route in the opposite direction in a time of 12 hours; in comparison to the competing Sikorsky S-42, the Empire was able to traverse the overall route faster.

Several more survey flights of the Atlantic were made by Caledonia and Cambria. In August 1937, Cambria conducted the East-West flight in 14 hrs 24 min. In 1937, Cavalier was shipped to Bermuda and, after reassembly, started a service between there and New York City on 25 May 1937.

After the design of the Empire had been finalised and production had commenced, it was recognised that, with some pressure from the United States, it would be desirable to offer a similar service across the Atlantic. The range of the S.23 was less than that of the equivalent American-built counterpart in the form of the Sikorsky S-42, and as such they could not provide a true trans-Atlantic service. Two boats (Caledonia and Cambria) were lightened and furnished with long-range tanks; both aircraft were used in experimental in-flight refuelling trials in order for them to conduct the journey; these modifications came at the cost of being able to carry fewer passengers and less cargo.

In an attempt to manage the Atlantic crossing, an alternative 'piggy-back' approach was trialled. This concept had been strongly advocated for by Imperial Airways' technical advisor, Major Robert Hobart Mayo, as a means of significantly increasing both range and payload, and had been well received by both the airline and the British Air Ministry, the latter of which placed an order with Shorts. Using the S.21 design (based on the S.23) as the carrier, a smaller four-engined floatplane, the Short S.20, was mounted upon its back; the most obvious difference between the S.21 and regular S.23 aeroplanes was the additional superstructure to carry the floatplane. Only a single example was built of the S.21 carrier aircraft, named Maia, and of the S.20, named Mercury. Together, they were known as the Short Mayo Composite.

In further flights, the Empire-Mercury combination went on to set a number of long distance records; one such flight was conducted on 6 October 1938, flying from Dundee, Scotland to Orange River, South Africa, covering  in 42 hrs 5 min. However, in spite of the demonstrated merits and workability of the concept, the outbreak of the Second World War resulted in the effective termination of all development work. During wartime, there was interest in the concept using alternative land-based aircraft to deliver Hawker Hurricane fighter aircraft for aerial protection over the mid-Atlantic.

After Italy entered the Second World War in June 1940, it became impossible for mail to be safely flown between Britain and Egypt (and thus onto Australia) via the Mediterranean. Accordingly, a new "Horseshoe Route" was established that ran from Auckland/Sydney via Cairo (following the old "Eastern Route") to Durban, South Africa, and thence by sea to Britain. This was restricted after the loss of Singapore in February 1942 to being between Durban and Calcutta, India.

Wartime experience in operating the type at overload weights resulted in the realisation that the Empires could take off at considerably higher weights than the conservative maxima provided by Shorts and, although the last Empire crossings to America were made in 1940 (by Clare and Clyde), many more flights were made on the long, demanding and vital over-water Lisbon-Bathurst flights.

Variants

42 "C Class" Short Empire flying boats were built, including 31 S.23s, nine S.30s and two S.33s. 
 S.23 Mk I : powered by four  Bristol Pegasus Xc poppet valve radial engines. 27 built.
 S.23 Mk II Bermuda : powered by four  Bristol Pegasus Xc poppet valve radial engines. 2 built.
 S.23 Mk III Atlantic : powered by four  Bristol Pegasus Xc poppet valve radial engines. two built.
 S.23M : two converted from impressed S.23 Mk I, with an ASV radar, armed with two Boulton Paul gun turrets and depth charges.
 S.30 Mk I : powered by four  Bristol Perseus XIIc sleeve valve radial engines. One built.
 S.30 Mk I (Cathay) : powered by four  Bristol Pegasus Xc poppet valve radial engines. One built.
 S.30 Mk II New Zealand : powered by four  Bristol Perseus XIIc sleeve valve radial engines. One built.
 S.30 Mk III Atlantic : powered by four  Bristol Perseus XIIc sleeve valve radial engines. Four built.
 S.30 Mk IV New Zealand : powered by four  Bristol Perseus XIIc sleeve valve radial engines. Two built.
 S.30M : two converted from impressed S.30 Mk III Atlantic for ASV trials and transport duties.
 S.33 : powered by four  Bristol Pegasus Xc poppet valve radial engines. Two completed, third example scrapped when 75% complete.

Many S.23, S.30 & S.33 were re-engined during the war with  Bristol Pegasus XXII poppet valve radial engines.

Accidents and incidents
Most accidents involving the aircraft occurred during landing and were generally attributed to pilot error.
For pilots trained on smaller less sophisticated aircraft judgement of height was difficult due to the high cockpit of the Empire, as well as the concept of using flaps to manage speed. With time improved familiarity reduced the accident rate. Once in service the structure was found to be weak in places, especially on the planing bottoms, which lead to later models employing thicker gauge skins on the hull and wings.

24 March 1937 G-ADVA Capricornus of Imperial Airways crashed in the Beaujolais mountains in Central France, during the inaugural Southampton to Alexandria scheduled service.
27 November 1938G-AETV Calpurnia of Imperial Airways crashed on landing on Lake Habbaniya, Iraq with the loss of four lives.
21 January 1939G-ADUU Cavalier of Imperial Airways ditched in the Atlantic Ocean due to carburettor icing affecting all four engines. The aircraft subsequently sank with the loss of three lives. Ten survivors were rescued by the American tanker .
14 March 1939 G-ADVB Corsair (under Capt E.S. Alcock, brother of John Alcock) foundered during a forced landing on the Dungu River. After ten months' salvage work, and one failed take-off attempt, it was flown off the river on 6 January 1940.
1 May 1939 G-ADVD Challenger of Imperial Airways crashed on landing in Mozambique Harbour with the loss of two lives.
February 1941G-AFCX Clyde of BOAC was wrecked in a gale at Lisbon, Portugal.
29 December 1941G-ADUX Cassiopeia of BOAC crashed after striking debris on takeoff from Sabang, Indonesia, killing four.
30 January 1942G-AEUH Corio of BOAC was shot down by seven Japanese fighter aircraft and crashed off West Timor, killing 13 of the 18 people on board. The aircraft was owned by BOAC, but was operated by Qantas.
22 April 1943G-AEUB (VH-ADU) crashed off Port Moresby, with eighteen survivors.

List of aircraft

Operators

Civil operators

 Qantas

 TEAL

 Imperial Airways
 BOAC

Military operators

 Royal Australian Air Force
 No. 11 Squadron RAAF
 No. 13 Squadron RAAF
 No. 20 Squadron RAAF
 No. 33 Squadron RAAF
 No. 41 Squadron RAAF

 Royal Air Force
 No. 119 Squadron RAF

Specifications (Short S.23)

See also

Notes

References
 
 BOAC at War – Part 2 – Aeroplane Monthly – August 1975.

 
 
 
 
 Knott, Richard, 'Flying Boats of the Empire', Robert Hale, 2011.
 Norris, Geoffrey. The Short Empire Boats (Aircraft in Profile Number 84). Leatherhead, Surrey, UK: Profile Publications Ltd., 1966. 

 Sims, Phillip, Adventurous Empires. Airlife Publishing, 2000.

External links

 Short C-Class Empire Boats – British Aircraft of World War II
 Century of Flight entry
ATLANTIC ROUTINE Flight 1937 – contemporary article on Sikorksy S42 and Empire Caledonia operating across Atlantic
  LIFE photos by Margaret Bourke-White of CAVALIER and its competitor the Bermuda Clipper New York area 1937
  LIFE photos by Margaret Bourke-White of CALEDONIA with a Beech Staggerwing near Central Park New York City July 1937
  LIFE colour photos by Dmitri Kessel of CLARE at the La Guardia Marine Terminal New York City, during a series of mail/courier flights it, and CLYDE, operated to New York via Newfoundland during the Battle of Britain, 1940
 The Short Sunderland Flying Boat Describes the development of the Empire though to Sunderland through flying boats.

1930s British mailplanes
1930s British airliners
Flying boats
Empire
Four-engined tractor aircraft
High-wing aircraft
Aircraft first flown in 1936
Four-engined piston aircraft